Song contest may refer to:

 Singing competition
 Songwriting competition
 A popularity contest amongst previously unreleased songs, notably the Sanremo Music Festival upon which many similar contests are based

See also
:Category: Song contests for notable song contests